Slota (Czech/Slovak feminine: Slotová) is a surname. Notable people with the surname include:

Gerald Slota (born 1965), American artist and photographer
Ján Slota (born 1953), Slovak politician

See also
 

Czech-language surnames
Slovak-language surnames